Cold noodles are dishes typically made out of noodles, soy sauce, cucumber, and various other ingredients. They are commonly served at room temperature with a dipping sauce on the side. The methods and ingredients used to make cold noodles vary from country to country.

Origins 
It is speculated that cold noodles first appeared in the Qin Dynasty of China.

China

Sichuan cold noodles 

Sichuan cold noodles is a dish originating in Sichuan, China. The dish is unique in that baking soda is added to the noodles. The dish also includes Sichuan seasonings like paprika and chili oil.

Guangyuan cold noodles 
Guangyuan cold noodles, originating in Sichuan, China, are made from rice instead of flour. Unlike other dishes, Guangyuan noodles can be served hot or cold.

Shanghai cold noodles 
Shanghai cold noodles, originating in Shanghai, China, consist of Shanghai-style noodles that are steamed, and then cooked to make them chewier. Peanut butter and other seasonings are added to this dish, giving the noodles more flavor.

Zhajiangmian 

Zhajiangmian is a traditional Chinese dish originating in Northeast China. The dish became popular during the late Qing Dynasty. The dish quickly spread around the world and many variations of these cold noodles began to appear. The most well-known and traditional variation is the Beijing zhajiangmian. Other well-known variants include , which is made from Korean black bean sauce.

Korea

Naengmyeon 
Naengmyeon is a cold noodle dish that is usually served in stainless steel bowls. The choice of flours and toppings for making the noodles varies with personal preference. Usually, naengmyeon is made with buckwheat flour and includes toppings like cucumbers and beef.

Jaengban-guksu 

Jaengban-guksu is a traditional cold noodle salad that is often served as a companion to Korean barbecue. This dish is made out of noodles, different toppings, and a spicy sauce. People alter the types of noodles and toppings of this dish based on their preference.

Kong-guksu 

Kong-guksu is a seasonal dish that is traditionally served in summer. The noodles are served in a cold broth made of soy milk; ice is sometimes added.

Bibim-guksu 
The choice of ingredients varies widely based on personal preference. "Sour and spicy sauce" is the signature component.

Japan

Soba noodles 

Soba is a traditional Japanese dish that can be served either cold or hot. Cold soba noodles are served with dipping sauce on the side, while hot versions of soba noodles are served with a soup base.

Sōmen noodles 

Sōmen are long, thin noodles that are associated with Japanese traditional ceremonies.

Thailand

Khanom 

Khanom chin is a traditional Thai noodle that has numerous variants. The noodles are made of rice but are sometimes replaced by white noodles as the noodles are difficult to make.

References 

Noodle dishes